Anhui Normal University is an institution of higher learning in Wuhu, Anhui Province, China.

Approved by the State Council in 1972, it was officially renamed Anhui Normal University, and the name was written by Guo Moruo.

Anhui Normal University is the only university in Wuhu to accept foreign students. The College of International Education usually has over 150 foreign students of many different nationalities including Cuban, British, French, German, Egyptian, Korean, Vietnamese, Thai, Yemenese, Japanese, Russian, Pakistan etc.

Introduction
Anhui Normal University is the oldest institution of higher education in Anhui Province and also one of the national comprehensive universities established at early stage. The predecessor of the school was the Provincial Anhui University, which was founded in Anqing in 1928. It was renamed the National Anhui University in 1946, and it was moved to Wuhu in December 1949. Later, it went through several stages of school running, including Anhui Teachers College, Hefei Teachers College, Southern Anhui University, and Anhui Agricultural and Mechanical University. In 1972, with the approval of the State Council, it was officially named Anhui Normal University. In 2005, Wuhu Teachers College merged into Anhui Normal University.

At present, the university has 16 colleges, 7 doctoral programs, 72 post graduated programs, 56 undergraduate programs. So far, there are 35,000 students from different provinces, more than 2600 teaching staffs, among them over 580 are professors and associate professors. The university has three campuses. It has an area of more than 3300 Mu (about 230 hectares), construction area of about 7.2 million square meters. The library comprises 2.576 million volumes of books, among which there are over 600 kinds of classical collections. It also has domestic and international natural resources and data bank.

The university attaches great importance to both domestic and international exchanges in education, and has established and developed long term friendly cooperation with several dozens of universities, research institutes, academic organisations in U.S.A., England, Germany, Sweden, Finland, Japan, Korea, Vietnam, Canada, and regions of Hong Kong, Macao and Taiwan, and has conducted all sorts of academic exchanges and cooperation, which have raised the teaching and research quality, and advanced its level of academic globalization.

The university is one of the earliest batched institutions of higher education appointed by the State to receive Chinese government scholarship international students, and one of the first national bases of Chinese language and culture to Overseas Chinese. Since 1985 it has received nearly 3000 foreign students from more than 40 countries for long and short term training.

The university is near beautiful scenic spots such as Yellow Mountain, Jiuhua Buddhist Mountain, groups of ancient villages towns. Communication and transportation to Nanjing and Shanghai are very convenient which makes life much more easier. Anhui Normal University is the ideal place of studying for international students.

Majors 
The Anhui normal university offers an eclectic mix of courses for foreign student of different countries to study.

Note:

1. Students who want a refresher course can choose from the majors mentioned above.

2. All the classes are taught in Chinese. Students with no Chinese foundation can come to the university and study Chinese for one semester or one year.
 Postgraduate (three years)
 Doctorate (three years)

Gallery of the campus

See also

 List of universities in China

References

External links
 Official website of AHNU
 Official Chinese website of AHNU

 
Teachers colleges in China
Universities and colleges in Anhui
Educational institutions established in 1972
1972 establishments in China
Educational institutions established in 1928
1928 establishments in China